Round Midnight is a 1963 studio album by the American jazz singer Betty Carter that was arranged by Claus Ogerman and Oliver Nelson.

Reception

Scott Yanow, writing on Allmusic.com gave Round Midnight two and a half stars out of five. Yanow commented of Carter in this period: "Her chance-taking style and unusual voice were mostly ignored and it would not be until the late '70s that she was finally 'discovered.' ...Her style was a lot freer than it had been in her earlier records but was still more accessible than it would be. Her repertoire" at the time "was already becoming eclectic."

Billboard gave Round Midnight its "4-star rating" in March 1963. The rating was given for "new albums with sufficient commercial potential."

Track listings

Personnel 
 Betty Carter – vocals
 Joe Newman – trumpet
 Conte Candoli – trumpet
 Jimmy Cleveland – trombone
 Phil Woods – alto & tenor saxophone
 Bob Ashton – tenor saxophone
 Richie Kamuca – tenor saxophone
 Danny Bank – baritone saxophone, bass clarinet
 Seymour Barab – cello
 Sidney Edwards
 Edgardo Sodero
 Lucien Schmit
 Lloyd Mayers – piano
 Walter Davis Jr. – piano
 Russ Freeman – piano
 Kenny Burrell – guitar
 John Pizzarelli – guitar
 Monty Budwig – double bass
 Richard Davis – double bass
 George Duvivier – double bass
 Gary Chester – drums
 Shelly Manne – drums
 Ed Shaughnessy – drums

References

1963 albums
Albums arranged by Oliver Nelson
Albums arranged by Claus Ogerman
Albums produced by Nesuhi Ertegun
Atco Records albums
Atlantic Records albums
Betty Carter albums